Ivan Bratko (born June 10, 1946) is a Slovene computer scientist working as a D. Sc. Professor of Computer and Information Science at the Faculty of Computer and Information Science at the University of Ljubljana.

Early life and education 
Bratko was born in Ljubljana in 1946. He earned a Bachelor of Science in mechanical engineering, Master of Science in mechanical engineering, and PhD in computer science from the University of Ljubljana.

Career 
Bratko has worked as a visiting professor and scientist at the University of Edinburgh, the University of Strathclyde, the University of Sydney, the University of New South Wales, Technical University of Madrid, the University of Klagenfurt, and the Delft University of Technology. He became an associate member of the Slovenian Academy of Sciences and Arts on May 27, 1997, and he has been full member since June 12, 2003.

From 2005 to 2007 Bratko served as a member of the managing body of the Programme Council for RTV Slovenia.

Bibliography 
 Bratko, Ivan. Prolog Programming for Artificial Intelligence, 4th edition. Pearson Education / Addison-Wesley, 2012. 
 Bratko Ivan, Igor Mozetič, Nada Lavrač. KARDIO: A Study in Deep and Qualitative Knowledge for Expert Systems. Cambridge, Massachusetts, MIT Press, 1989
 Bratko, Ivan, Rajkovič, Vladislav. Računarstvo s programskim jezikom Paskal, (Biblioteka Zanimljiva nauka). Beograd: Nolit, 1986.

References

External links
 Ivan Bratko

Slovenian computer scientists
Living people
1946 births
Scientists from Ljubljana
University of Ljubljana alumni
Academic staff of the University of Ljubljana
Members of the Slovenian Academy of Sciences and Arts